The Medal of Merit to the People is a Medal of Republika Srpska. It was established in 1993 by the Constitution of Republika Srpska and 'Law on orders and awards' valid since 28 April 1993.

The Medal of Merit for the People has one class and is awarded for merits gained in the fight against the enemy, for the liberation of the country and for the contribution to the construction and development of Republika Srpska. 

It is awarded in peace to individuals, institutions and other organizations for their contribution to the development and progress of Republika Srpska. The inscription on the medal reads: For the Cross of Honor and Golden Freedom, Republika Srpska.

Notable recipients
 2018 -  Zoran Dragić
 2019 -  Bojan Mikulić

See also 
 Orders, decorations and medals of Republika Srpska

References

Orders, decorations, and medals of Republic of Srpska
Awards established in 1993